Patyegarang (c 1780s) was an Australian Aboriginal woman, thought to be from the Cammeraygal clan of the Eora nation.  Patyegarang (pronounced Pa-te-ga-rang) taught William Dawes the language of her people and is thought to be one of the first people to have taught an Aboriginal language to the early colonists in New South Wales.

Contact with the colonists
Patyegarang was aged around 15 when she became a guide and language teacher to William Dawes. Dawes, an astronomer, mathematician and linguist, was a lieutenant in the Royal Marines on board , of the First Fleet, to the Colony of New South Wales. William Dawes met Patye (as he would call her) when he struck up friendships with the local Cadigal people.

Documenting language
William Dawes was the first person to write down an Australian language. Patyegarang tutored Dawes in his understanding and assisted in the documentation of the Dharug or Eora language spoken by the Cadigal people and other tribes, sometimes referred to as the Sydney language.   Patyegarang was one of the first people to have taught an Aboriginal language to a non-Aboriginal person.  Together they made the first detailed study of Australian Indigenous languages, compiling vocabularies, grammatical forms, and many expressions in the language during his three-year stay in the colony.

Three notebooks compiled by William Dawes survive. The language notebooks were discovered by Phyllis Mander-Jones, an Australian librarian, while she was working at the University of London's School of Oriental and African Studies (SOAS).

The notebooks include specific terms for the sun, the moon and the clouds leading Indigenous Curator James Wilson Miller to note that Patyegarang had detailed knowledge of the land and sky.

Relationship with William Dawes
Patyegarang may have lived with William Dawes in his hut at Observatory Point.  Some of the expressions she shared with Dawes, such as Putuwá which means "to warm one's hand by the fire and then to squeeze gently the fingers of another person" indicate a close relationship.  Australian writer Thomas Keneally describes Patyegarang as the "chief language teacher, servant, and perhaps lover" of William Dawes.

Patyegarang learned to speak and read English from Dawes. It is not clear how long she was associated with him or what eventually happened to her.

Proposal for statue of Patyegarang
In 2020 a motion was put to the Council of the City of Sydney proposing that the council's CEO "work with local Aboriginal groups, including a representative from the Metropolitan Local Aboriginal Land Council (MLALC), to identify potential options to commission a public artwork commemorating Patyegarang".

In popular culture
In 2014, the Bangarra Dance Theatre created a work choreographed by Stephen Page called Patyegarang depicting her life and relationship with Dawes.

Writer Kate Grenville based the characters in her novel The Lieutenant on the historical friendship of Patyegarang, the young Gadigal woman, and Lieutenant William Dawes.

See also
 William Dawes (British Marines officer)
 Dharug language

References

Further reading
 
 

Eora people
History of Australia (1788–1850)